The 1st Race of Champions was a non-Championship motor race, run to Formula One rules, held on 13 March 1965 at Brands Hatch circuit in Kent, England. The race was run over two heats of 40 laps of the circuit, and was won overall by Mike Spence in a Lotus 33.

The first heat was won by Jim Clark, with Dan Gurney second, and Spence in third place. However, both Clark and Gurney retired from the second heat, which Spence won from Jo Bonnier and Frank Gardner. Jackie Stewart finished seventh in the first heat and fourth in the second, to take second overall.

Results 

 Bloor, Hawkins and Rhodes were reserves for the first heat and did not take part. All three started the second heat after the disqualifications of Scarfiotti and Schlesser, and Gregory's mechanical problems prevented him from continuing.

References 
 John Thompson, The Formula One Record Book, 1974.

Race of Champions
Race of Champions (Brands Hatch)
Gold
March 1965 sports events in the United Kingdom